Martin Christophe Jannick Remacle (born 16 May 1997) is a Belgian professional footballer who plays as a midfielder for Romanian side Universitatea Cluj, on loan from FC Botoșani.

Club career
Remacle is a youth exponent from Standard Liège. On 10 April 2016, he made his Belgian Pro League debut against K.V. Kortrijk.

On 30 January 2017, Italian club Torino announced they had signed Remacle. On 5 March 2017, he was included in the Torino's first-team squad for the first time, when he was an unused substitute in a game against Palermo.

Honours

Standard Liège
Belgian Cup: 2015–16
Belgian Super Cup runner-up: 2016

References

External links

1997 births
People from Verviers
Living people
Belgian footballers
Belgian expatriate footballers
Belgium youth international footballers
Standard Liège players
Torino F.C. players
Enosis Neon Paralimni FC players
Ayia Napa FC players
Liga II players
CS Pandurii Târgu Jiu players
Liga I players
FC Voluntari players
FC Botoșani players
FC Universitatea Cluj players
Belgian Pro League players
Cypriot Second Division players
Belgian Third Division players
Association football midfielders
Belgian expatriate sportspeople in Italy
Belgian expatriate sportspeople in Cyprus
Belgian expatriate sportspeople in Romania
Expatriate footballers in Italy
Expatriate footballers in Cyprus
Expatriate footballers in Romania
Footballers from Liège Province